The Sts. Constantine and Helen Chapel, in Lime Village, Alaska, United States, in the Bethel Census Area, is a historic Russian Orthodox church that was built in 1923. Now it is under Diocese of Alaska of the Orthodox Church in America

It is simple and square,  in each dimension, built of logs, and is argued to be "the evocation of a rural R.O. church structure in Alaska, an outstanding example of durable utile architectural simplicity."
It was listed on the National Register of Historic Places in 1980.

See also
National Register of Historic Places listings in Bethel Census Area, Alaska

References

1923 establishments in Alaska
20th-century Eastern Orthodox church buildings
Churches completed in 1923
Churches on the National Register of Historic Places in Alaska
Buildings and structures on the National Register of Historic Places in Bethel Census Area, Alaska
Russian Orthodox church buildings in Alaska
Log buildings and structures on the National Register of Historic Places in Alaska